Hegemone , also known as , is a natural satellite of Jupiter. It was discovered by a team of astronomers from the University of Hawaii led by Scott S. Sheppard in 2003, and given the temporary designation .

Hegemone is about 3 kilometres in diameter, and orbits Jupiter at an average distance of 23,703,000 km in 745.500 days, at an inclination of 153° to the ecliptic (151° to Jupiter's equator), in a retrograde direction and with an eccentricity of 0.4077.

It was named in March 2005 after Hegemone, one of the Graces, and a daughter of Zeus (Jupiter).

Hegemone belongs to the Pasiphae group, irregular retrograde moons orbiting Jupiter at distances ranging between 22.8 and 24.1 Gm, and with inclinations ranging between 144.5° and 158.3°.

References

Pasiphae group
Moons of Jupiter
Irregular satellites
Discoveries by Scott S. Sheppard
Astronomical objects discovered in 2003
Moons with a retrograde orbit